Elgiazar Farashyan (also known by the mononym Egiazar born 2 November 1988) is a Belarusian singer. Born in Armenia, Farashyan and his family relocated to the Gomel region in eastern Belarus when he was five years old.

Farashyan's musical ambitions were fostered by his mother, a vocal teacher. He studied at the Gomel College of Art. 

Along with pop group 3+2, Farashyan represented Belarus in the Eurovision Song Contest 2010. Originally the song "Far Away" was chosen. But eventually Belarus decided wo take part with the song "Butterflies".

References

External links
YouTube EGIAZAR official page

1988 births
Living people
Armenian emigrants to Belarus
21st-century Belarusian male singers
Eurovision Song Contest entrants of 2010
Eurovision Song Contest entrants for Belarus